eyeOS is a web desktop following the cloud computing concept that seeks to enable collaboration and communication among users. It is mainly written in PHP, XML, and JavaScript. It is a private-cloud application platform with a web-based desktop interface. Commonly called a cloud desktop because of its unique user interface, eyeOS delivers a whole desktop from the cloud with file management, personal management information tools, collaborative tools and with the integration of the client’s applications.

History
The first publicly available eyeOS version was released on August 1, 2005, as eyeOS 0.6.0 in Olesa de Montserrat, Barcelona (Spain). Quickly, a worldwide community of developers took part in the project and helped improve it by translating, testing and developing it.

After two years of development, the eyeOS Team published eyeOS 1.0 (on June 4, 2007). Compared with previous versions, eyeOS 1.0 introduced a complete reorganization of the code and some new web technologies, like eyeSoft, a portage-based web software installation system. Moreover, eyeOS also included the eyeOS Toolkit, a set of libraries allowing easy and fast development of new web Applications.

With the release of eyeOS 1.1 on July 2, 2007, eyeOS changed its license and migrated from GNU GPL Version 2 to Version 3.

Version 1.2 was released just a few months after the 1.1 version and integrated full compatibility with Microsoft Word files.

 eyeOS 1.5 Gala was released on January 15, 2008.  This version is the first to support both Microsoft Office and OpenOffice.org file formats for documents, presentations and spreadsheets. It also has the ability to import and export documents in both formats using server side scripting.

 eyeOS 1.6 was released on April 25, 2008, and included many improvements such as synchronization with local computers, drag and drop, a mobile version and more.

 eyeOS 1.8 Lars was released on January 7, 2009 and featured a completely rewritten file manager and a new sound API to develop media rich applications. Later, on April 1, 2009, 1.8.5 was released with a new default theme and some rewritten apps such as the Word Processor or the Address Book. On July 13, 2009, 1.8.6 was released with an interface for the iPhone and a new version of eyeMail with support for POP3 and IMAP.

 eyeOS 1.9 was released December 29, 2009. It was followed up with 1.9.0.1 release with minor fixes on February 18, 2010.  These last two releases were the last of the "CLASSIC DESKTOP" interface.  A major re-work was released completed in March 2010. This new product was dubbed EyeOS 2.x.

However, a small group of eyeOS developers still maintain the code within the eyeOS forum, where support is provided but the eyeOS group itself has stopped active 1.x development. It is now available as the On-eye project on GitHub.

Active development halted on 1.x as of February 3, 2010. eyeOS 2.0 release took place on March 3, 2010.  This was a total re-structure of the OS operating system.  The 2.x stable is the new series of eyeOS which is in active development and will replace 1.x as stable in a few months. It includes live collaboration and many more social capabilities than eyeOS 1.x.

EyeOS released 2.2.0.0 on July 28, 2010.

On December 14, 2010, a working group inside eyeOS opensource development community began the structure development and further upgrade of eyeOS 1.9.x.  The group's main goal is to continue the work eyeOS has stopped on 1.9.x.

EyeOS released 2.5 on May 17, 2011.  This was the last release under an open source license. It is available in SourceForge for download under another project called 2.5 OpenSource Version.

On April 1, 2014, Telefónica announced the acquisition of eyeOS, but this acquisition reinforces its future mobile cloud services plans and the development of free software solutions. eyeOS will maintain its headquarters in the Catalan city, where their staff will continue to work but will now form part of Telefónica. After its integration into Telefónica, eyeOS will continue to function as an independent subsidiary, led by its current CEO Michel Kisfaludi.

Structure and API
For developers, Eye OS provides the eyeOS Toolkit, a set of libraries and functions to develop applications for eyeOS. Using the integrated Portage-based eyeSoft system, one can create their own repository for eyeOS and distribute applications through it.

Each core part of the desktop is its own application, using JavaScript to send server commands as the user interacts. As actions are performed using AJAX (such as launching an application), it sends event information to the server. The server then sends back tasks for the client to do in XML format, such as drawing a widget.

On the server, eyeOS uses XML files to store information. This makes it simple for a user to set up on the server, as it requires zero configuration other than the account information for the first user, making it simple to deploy. To avoid bottlenecks that flat files present, each user's information and settings are stored in different files, preventing resource starvation from occurring; Though this in turn may create issues in high volume user environments due to host operating system open file descriptor limits.

Professional edition
A Professional Edition of eyeOS was launched on September 15, 2011, as an operating system for businesses. It uses a new version number and was released under version 1.0 instead of continuing with the next version number in the open source project. The Professional Edition retains the web desktop interface used by the open source version, while targeting enterprise users. A host of new features designed for enterprises like file sharing and synchronization (called eyeSync), Active Directory/LDAP connectivity, system wide administration controls and a local file execution tool called eyeRun were introduced. A new suite of Web Apps (A mail client, calendar, instant messaging and collaboration tools) was also introduced, specific to the enterprise edition for the web desktop. With the eyeOS Professional Edition 1.1, a to-do task manager tool, Citrix XenApp integration and a Facebook like 'wall' for collaboration were introduced.

Awards
 2007 – Received the Softpedia's Pick award.
 2007 – Finalist at the SourceForge's 2007 Community Choice Awards at the "Best Project" category. The winner for that category was 7-Zip.
 2007 – Won the Yahoo! Spain Web Revelation award in the Technology category.
 2008 – Finalist for the Webware 100 awards by CNET, under the "Browsing" category.
 2008 – Finalist at the SourceForge's 2008 Community Choice Awards at the "Most Likely to Change the World" category. The winner for that category was Linux.
 2009 – Selected Project of the Month (August 2009) by SourceForge.
 2009 – BMW Innovation Award.
 2010 – Winner of Accelera (Ernst & Young).
 2010 – Asturias & Girona Spanish Prince award “IMPULSA”.
 2011 – Winner of MIT’s TR35 award as Innovator of the year in Spain.

Community
eyeOS community is formed with the eyeOS forums, which arrived at 10.000 members at April 4, 2008, the eyeOS wiki and the eyeOS Application Communities, available at eyeOS-Apps website hosted and provided by openDesktop.org as well as Softpedia.

See also
 Web portal
 Web 2.0

References

Web desktops
Web 2.0
Cloud computing
Free content management systems
Free software operating systems
Software using the GNU AGPL license
Formerly free software